The history of opium in China began with the use of opium for medicinal purposes during the 7th century. In the 17th century the practice of mixing opium with tobacco for smoking spread from Southeast Asia, creating a far greater demand.

Imports of opium into China stood at 200 chests annually in 1729, when the first anti-opium edict was promulgated. By the time Chinese authorities reissued the prohibition in starker terms in 1799, the figure had leaped; 4,500 chests were imported in the year 1800.  The decade of the 1830s witnessed a rapid rise in opium trade, and by 1838, just before the First Opium War, it had climbed to 40,000 chests. The rise continued on after the Treaty of Nanking (1842) that concluded the war. By 1858 annual imports had risen to 70,000 chests, approximately equivalent to global production of opium for the decade surrounding the year 2000.

By the late 19th century Chinese domestic opium production challenged and then surpassed imports. The 20th century opened with effective campaigns to suppress domestic farming, and in 1907 the British government signed a treaty to eliminate imports. The fall of the Qing dynasty in 1911, however, led to a resurgence in domestic production. The Nationalist Government, provincial governments, the revolutionary bases of the Chinese Communist Party (CCP), and the British colonial government of Hong Kong all depended on opium taxes as major sources of revenue, as did the Japanese occupation governments during the Second Sino-Japanese War (1937–1945). After 1949, both the respective governments of the People's Republic of China on the mainland and of the Republic of China on Taiwan claimed to have successfully suppressed the widespread growth and use of opium. In fact, opium products were still in production in Xinjiang and Northeast China.

Early history 
Historical accounts suggest that opium first arrived in China during the Tang dynasty (618907) as part of the merchandise of Arab traders. Later on, Song Dynasty (9601279) poet and pharmacologist Su Dongpo recorded the use of opium as a medicinal herb: "Daoists often persuade you to drink the jisu water, but even a child can prepare the yingsu soup."

Initially used by medical practitioners to control bodily fluid and preserve qi or vital force, during the Ming dynasty (13681644), the drug also functioned as an aphrodisiac or chunyao as Xu Boling records in his mid-fifteenth century Yingjing Juan:
It is mainly used to treat masculinity, strengthen sperm, and regain vigour. It enhances the art of alchemists, sex and court ladies. Frequent use helps to cure the chronic diarrhea that causes the loss of energy ... Its price equals that of gold.

Ming rulers obtained opium via the tributary system, when it was known as wuxiang or "black spice".

First listed as a taxable commodity in 1589, opium remained legal until the end of Ming dynasty, 1637.

Growth of the opium trade

In the 16th century the Portuguese became aware of the lucrative medicinal and recreational trade of opium into China, and from their factories across Asia chose to supply the Canton System, to satisfy both the medicinal and the recreational use of the drug. By 1729 the Yongzheng Emperor had criminalised the new recreational smoking of opium in his empire. 

Following the 1764 Battle of Buxar, the British East India Company (EIC) became the rulers of Bengal, Bihar, and Orissa. The EIC gained control of tax collection, along with the opium monopoly of the defeated Mughal Empire. The East India Company Act, 1793 formally established this monopoly. The EIC was £28 million in debt as a result of the Indian war, and found it difficult to raise silver to pay for Chinese tea that it sold to the British market, which had to be paid for in silver. 

To address the issue, the EIC began auctions of opium in Calcutta to raise revenues. Since importation of opium into China was banned by Chinese law, the EIC established an indirect trading scheme relying partially on legal markets and also leveraging illicit ones. British merchants would first buy tea in Canton (Guangzhou) on credit. They would pay their debts by selling opium at auction in Calcutta. This opium was then transported to the Chinese coast aboard British ships, where it was sold to native merchants who would sell it in China. According to 19th Century sinologist Edward Parker, there were four types of opium smuggled into China from India: kung pan t'ou (公班土, gongban tu or "Patna"); Pak t'ou (白土, bai tu or "Malwa"); Persian, Kem fa t'ou (金花土, jinhua tu) and the "smaller kong pan", which was of a "dearer sort", i.e. more expensive. A description of the cargo aboard  at Lintin in July 1833 distinguished between "new" and "old" Patna, "new" and "old" Benares, and Malwa; the accounting also specifies the number of chests of each type, and the price per chest. The "chests" contained small balls of opium that had originated in the Indian provinces of Bengal and Madras.

In 1797 the EIC further tightened its grip on the opium trade by enforcing direct trade between opium farmers and the British, and ending the role of Bengali purchasing agents. The Jiaqing Emperor issued a decree banning imports of the drug in 1799. While China had trade relations with Britain, in order to balance financial books between the two Britain sold China opium from India which added to availability of opium in China's society. By 1804 the trade deficit had turned into a surplus, leading to seven million silver dollars going to India between 1806 and 1809. Meanwhile, Americans entered the opium trade with less expensive but inferior Turkish opium and by 1810 had around 10% of the trade in Canton. The EIC opium processed in Patna and Benares was supplemented in the 1820s with opium from Malwa in the non-British controlled part of India. Competition drove prices down, but production was stepped up.

In the same year the Emperor issued a further edict:
Opium has a harm. Opium is a poison, undermining our good customs and morality. Its use is prohibited by law. Now the commoner, Yang, dares to bring it into the Forbidden City. Indeed, he flouts the law!

However, recently the purchasers, eaters, and consumers of opium have become numerous. Deceitful merchants buy and sell it to gain profit....If we confine our search for opium to the seaports, we fear the search will not be sufficiently thorough. We should also order the general commandant of the police and police- censors at the five gates to prohibit opium and to search for it at all gates. If they capture any violators, they should immediately punish them and should destroy the opium at once. As to Kwangtung (Guangdong) and Fukien (Fujian), the provinces from which opium comes, we order their viceroys, governors, and superintendents of the maritime customs to conduct a thorough search for opium, and cut off its supply.

The decree had little effect. By Qianlong’s time opium had become a mainstream recreation among scholars and officials, and by the 1830s the practice had become widespread in cities. The increase in popularity was a result of both social and economic shifts between the Ming and the Qing dynasties in which there was a boost in commercialization, consumerism, and urbanization of opium within the general public. “Opium,” says one recent scholar, became “leisurely, urban, cultured and a status symbol” as an evidence of wealth, leisure, and culture. The Qing government, far away in Beijing, was unable to halt opium smuggling in the southern provinces. A porous Chinese border and rampant local demand facilitated the trade. By 1838 there were millions of Chinese opium users  opium was the main painkiller in a pre-aspirin age. They were less reliable workers and the silver they sent abroad was hurting the economy.   More and more Chinese were smoking British opium as a recreational drug. But for many, what started as recreation soon became a punishing addiction: many people who stopped ingesting opium suffered chills, nausea, and cramps, and sometimes died from withdrawal. Once addicted, people would often do almost anything to continue to get access to the drug. Therefore the Daoguang Emperor demanded action. Officials at the court who advocated legalizing and taxing the trade were defeated by those who advocated suppressing it. The Emperor sent the leader of the hard line faction, Special Imperial Commissioner Lin Zexu, to Canton, where he quickly arrested Chinese opium dealers and summarily demanded that foreign firms turn over their stocks with no compensation. When they refused, Lin stopped trade altogether and placed the foreign residents under virtual siege in their factories, eventually forcing the merchants to surrender their opium. Lin destroyed the confiscated opium, a total of some 1,000 long tons (1,016 t), a process which took 23 days.

First Opium War 

China's crackdown on the use of opium clashed with Britain, which advocated for free trade as British merchants were the source of trading opium into China. In compensation for the opium destroyed by Commissioner Lin, British traders demanded compensation from their home government. This put pressure on India from China as the overwhelming demand for opium was straining as the fixed supply simply no longer reached demands. However, British authorities believed that the Chinese were responsible for payment and sent expeditionary forces from India, which defeated the Qing army and navy in a series of battles and brought China to the negotiating table. The 1842 Treaty of Nanking not only opened the way for further opium trade, but ceded the territory of Hong Kong, unilaterally fixed Chinese tariffs at a low rate, gave Britain most favored nation status and permitted them diplomatic representation. Three million dollars in compensation for debts that the Hong merchants in Canton owed British merchants for the destroyed opium was also to be paid under Article V.

Second Opium War 

Despite the new ports available for trade under the Treaty of Nanking, by 1854 Britain's imports from China had reached nine times their exports to the country. At the same time British imperial finances came under further pressure from the expense of administering the burgeoning colonies of Hong Kong and Singapore in addition to India. Only the latter's opium could balance the deficit. Along with various complaints about the treatment of British merchants in Chinese ports and the Qing government's refusal to accept further foreign ambassadors, the relatively minor "Arrow Incident" provided the pretext the British needed to expand their opium trade in China. 

The Arrow was a merchant lorcha with an expired British registration that the Qing authorities seized for alleged salt smuggling. British authorities complained to the Governor-general of Liangguang, Ye Mingchen, that the seizure breached Article IX of the 1843 Treaty of the Bogue with regard to extraterritoriality. Matters quickly escalated and led to the Second Opium War, sometimes referred to as the "Arrow War" or the "Second Anglo-Chinese War", which broke out in 1856. A number of clashes followed until the war ended with the signature of the Treaty of Tientsin in 1860. Although the new treaty did not expressly legalise opium, it opened a further five ports to trade and for the first time allowed foreign traders access to the vast hinterland of China beyond the coast.

Aftermath of the Opium Wars 
The treaties with the British soon led to similar arrangements with the United States and France. These later became known as the Unequal Treaties, while the Opium Wars, according to Chinese historians, represented the start of China's "Century of humiliation".

The opium trade faced intense enmity from the later British Prime Minister William Ewart Gladstone. As a member of Parliament, Gladstone called it "most infamous and atrocious" referring to the opium trade between China and British India in particular. Gladstone was fiercely against both of the Opium Wars and ardently opposed to the British trade in opium to China. He lambasted it as "Palmerston's Opium War" and said that he felt "in dread of the judgments of God upon England for our national iniquity towards China" in May 1840. Gladstone criticized it as "a war more unjust in its origin, a war more calculated in its progress to cover this country with permanent disgrace,". His hostility to opium stemmed from the effects of opium brought upon his sister Helen. Due to the First Opium war brought on by Palmerston, there was initial reluctance to join the government of Peel on part of Gladstone before 1841.

Domestication and suppression in the last decades of the Qing dynasty

Once the turmoil caused by the mid-century Taiping Rebellion died down, the economy came to depend on opium to play several roles. Merchants found the substance useful as a substitute for cash, as it was readily accepted in the interior provinces such as Sichuan and Yunnan while the drug weighed less than the equivalent amount of copper. Since poppies could be grown in almost any soil or weather, cultivation quickly spread. Local officials could then meet their tax quotas by relying on poppy growers even in areas where other crops had not recovered. Although the government continued to require suppression, local officials often merely went through the motions both because of bribery and because they wanted to avoid antagonizing local farmers who depended on this lucrative crop. One official complained that when people heard a government inspector was coming, they would merely pull up a few poppy stalks to spread by the side of the road to give the appearance of complying. A provincial governor observed that opium, once regarded as a poison, was now treated in the same way as tea or rice. In the Qing dynasty all aspects of society had been affected by opium by the 1800s. Recreational use of opium expanded to all areas of China from the urban inland to the rural county sides. It also filtered down from the urban elites and middle class to the lower, working class citizens. By the 1880s, even governors who had initially suppressed opium smoking and poppy production now depended on opium taxes. The historian Jonathan Spence notes that the harm opium caused has long been clear, but that in a stagnating economy, opium supplied fluid capital and created new sources of taxes. Smugglers, poor farmers, coolies, retail merchants and officials all depended on opium for their livelihood. In the last decade of the dynasty, however, a focused moral outrage overcame these vested interests.

When the Qing government launched new opium suppression campaigns after 1901, the opposition no longer came from the British, whose sales had suffered greatly from domestic competition in any case, but from Chinese farmers who would be wiped out by the loss of their most profitable crop-derivative. Further opposition to the government moves came from wholesalers and retailers as well as from the millions of opium users, many of whom came from influential families. The government persevered, creating further dissent amongst the people, and at the same time promoted cooperation with international anti-narcotic agencies. Nevertheless, despite the imposition of new blanket import duties under the 1902 Mackay Treaty, Indian opium remained exempt and taxable at 110 taels per chest with the treaty stating "there was no intention of interfering with China's right to tax native opium".

The International Opium Commission observed that opium smoking was a fashionable, even refined pastime, especially among the young, yet many in society condemned the habit. At this time the act of opium smoking was prevalent among students, soldiers, urban middle class, and wealthier peasants. One of the most influential groups was the sex industry that dominated the scene as the combination of both opium smoking and sex was the favoured pastime. In 1907 Great Britain signed a treaty agreeing to gradually eliminate opium exports to China over the next decade while China agreed to eliminate domestic production over that period.

Republican China
The combination of foreign and domestic efforts proved largely successful, but the fall of the Qing government in 1911 effectively meant the end of the anti-opium campaign. Local and provincial governments quickly turned back to opium as a source of revenue, and foreign governments no longer felt obliged to continue their efforts to eliminate the trade.

In the northern provinces of Ningxia and Suiyuan in China, Chinese Muslim General Ma Fuxiang both prohibited and engaged in the opium trade. It was hoped that Ma Fuxiang would have improved the situation, since Chinese Muslims were well known for opposition to smoking opium. Ma Fuxiang officially prohibited opium and made it illegal in Ningxia, but the Guominjun reversed his policy; by 1933, people from every level of society were abusing the drug, and Ningxia was left in destitution. In 1923, an officer of the Bank of China from Baotou found out that Ma Fuxiang was assisting the drug trade in opium which helped finance his military expenses. He earned $2 million from taxing those sales in 1923. General Ma had been using the bank, a branch of the Government of China's exchequer, to arrange for silver currency to be transported to Baotou to use it to sponsor the trade.
 
The Nationalist Government under General Chiang Kai Shek during the Nanjing Decade (1928- 1937) followed contradictory opium policies. Chiang himself was morally opposed to opium use, but other government ministers saw opium as a source of much needed revenue. The government first attempted to reform the people into proper citizens to conform to the modern standards, then raised the official price, which discouraged a certain number of people, then sometimes shot the recidivists (strangely about one per county). Chiang also turned to the Green Gang mob boss Du Yuesheng to head the Shanghai Opium Suppression Bureau. Remarked one American diplomat, "the real motive appears to be to increase revenues by drawing within the orbit of the Opium Suppression Bureau the opium traffic in the Settlement and French Concessions." Prohibition, that is, was a guise to extend the government opium monopoly. "Suppression" officials talked openly of their duty to realize more opium revenue for the government.

During the Second Sino-Japanese War, to raise funds, the CCP in the Shaan-Gan-Ning Border Region cultivated and taxed opium (alias "特货", lit 'special good') production and dealing, selling to Japanese-occupied and Kuomintang provinces. According to Jonathan Marshall, Chongqing also regard opium as a key commodity in the smuggling from KMT controlled zone including Sichuan and Yunnan to Japanese occupied zone for compensating urgent government expeditions and military costing during protracted war era. To raise necessary revenue, Chongqing also permitted Shanghai Green Gang leader Du Yuesheng possessing many connections with Japanese controlled territory to manage opium smuggling business. Du's operation was under general Taili who took charge of anti-smuggling bureau’s supervision.

Under Mao
The Mao Zedong government is generally credited with eradicating both consumption and production of opium during the 1950s using unrestrained repression and social reform. Ten million addicts were forced into compulsory treatment, dealers were executed, and opium-producing regions were planted with new crops. Remaining opium production shifted south of the Chinese border into the Golden Triangle region. The remnant opium trade primarily served Southeast Asia, but spread to American soldiers during the Vietnam War, with 20 percent of soldiers regarding themselves as addicted during the peak of the epidemic in 1971. In 2003, China was estimated to have four million regular drug users and one million registered drug addicts.

See also 
Illegal drug trade in China
Madak
Old China Trade
Levant Company
Triangular trade
David Sassoon (treasurer)

Notes

References

Bibliography

 

 

 

 

 

 

 . popular history.

(Kindle version)

Further reading 

 
 Fairbank, John King. Trade and Diplomacy on the China Coast: The Opening of the treaty ports, 1842-1854 (Cambridge, Harvard U. P, 1953) online.
 
 

 
China